The All Hallows Guild Carousel or simply the Traveling Carousel is a historic carousel housed at the National Cathedral in Washington, D.C. since 1963. Previously, it was a "county fair" carousel operated by Clifford Sandretzky as part of a traveling carnival based in the northern Virginia area.  The rare all-wood carousel was likely built in the 1890s by the Merry-Go-Round Company of Cincinnati and has a rare caliola with brass pipes that was built by the Rudolph Wurlitzer Company of North Tonawanda, New York in 1937.

The original operator, Clifford Sandretzky, sold the carousel to the All Hallows Guild of the National Cathedral in 1963 who has owned it since.  It was used several times per year at fund raising events and then disassembled and placed in storage.  More recently, the carousel has been assembled and used only once a year at the Guild's Spring Flower Show.

There are 24 animal figures on the carousel plus two chariots. The animals are formed into 12 pairs. The animals include a single lion, zebra, and elephant, pairs of goats, camels, and deer, four standing horses, and nine jumping horses. They are brightly painted and hand-carved in the European tradition.

A gasoline engine located near the  center pole drives the carousel. A yellow and white canopy covers the structure and is topped by a small flag.

The All Hallows Guild Carousel is one of only two carousels listed on the National Carousel Census in the District of Columbia.  The other, the Smithsonian Carousel on the National Mall, is a larger, non-traveling carousel with 60 wood and metal composition figures built fifty years after the All Hallows Guild Carousel.

References

External links

All Hallows Guild, official website
Photos from All Hallows Guild 
Photos from the National Carousel Association

Buildings and structures on the National Register of Historic Places in Washington, D.C.
Amusement rides introduced in 1890
Carousels on the National Register of Historic Places
Washington National Cathedral